The 2021 Cork Intermediate A Hurling Championship was the second staging of the Cork Intermediate A Hurling Championship and the 112th staging overall of a championship for middle-ranking intermediate hurling teams in Cork. The draw for the group stage placings took place on 29 April 2021. The championship began on 11 September 2021 and ended on 20 November 2021.

The final was played on 20 November 2021 at Páirc Uí Chaoimh in Cork, between Castlemartyr and Sarsfields, in what was their first ever meeting in a final in this grade. Castlemartyr won the match by 1-19 to 0-12 to claim their first championship title.

Participating teams

The seedings were based on final group stage positions from the 2020 championship.

Group A

Table

Fixtures and results

Group B

Table

Fixtures and results

Group C

Table

Fixtures and results

Knockout stage

Relegation playoff

Quarter-finals

Semi-finals

Final

References

External link

 Cork GAA website

Cork Senior A Hurling Championship
Cork Intermediate Hurling Championship